Sirati (also Romanized as Sīratī; also known as Sīratī-ye Soflá) is a village in Poshtkuh-e Rostam Rural District, Sorna District, Rostam County, Fars Province, Iran. At the 2006 census, its population was 56, in 9 families.

References 

Populated places in Rostam County